Mary Ursula Bethell (pseudonym, Evelyn Hayes; 6 October 1874 – 15 January 1945), was a New Zealand social worker and poet. She settled at the age of 50 at Rise Cottage on the Cashmere Hills near Christchurch, with her companion Effie Pollen, where she created a sheltered garden with views over the city and towards the Southern Alps, and began writing poems about the landscape. Although she considered herself "by birth and choice English", and spent her life travelling between England and New Zealand, she was one of the first distinctively New Zealand poets, seen today as a pioneer of its modern poetry.

Background and social work
Bethell was the eldest daughter of the well-to-do sheep farmer Richard Bethell and his wife Isabel Anne, née Lillie, and was born in Horsell, Surrey, England, in 1874. Her parents had both lived in New Zealand in the 1860s, but returned to London where they married. Shortly after her birth, in 1875, her parents returned with her to New Zealand, where her two younger siblings were born. She was educated at Rangiora Primary School and Christchurch Girls' High School, and developed a love of the Canterbury landscape that would last for the rest of her life. In later years, she wrote of the Ashley River:

Her father died in April 1885. Two years later, at age 15, she travelled back to England and boarded with the family of Ruth Mayhew, who became a lifelong friend, as she attended Oxford High School for Girls and a Swiss finishing school. She returned to New Zealand in 1892 and devoted herself to charitable work, before again returning to Europe in 1895 to study painting in Geneva and music in Dresden. Having enough private wealth to support herself, she took up social work in London with the Anglican organisation Women Workers for God, or "Grey Ladies". She continued to perform social work in a religious context in England and New Zealand, travelling between the two, including in the war years.

In 1924 Bethell permanently settled in New Zealand, in the Cashmere Hills near Christchurch. She bought a newly built home, Rise Cottage in Westenra Terrace, which she shared with another returnee New Zealander, Effie Pollen. The theory that Bethell's relationship with Pollen was homosexual (which would have sat ill with her Anglicanism and her social aspirations in that period) was explored in some detail by the fellow poet Janet Charman, as a visiting scholar at the University of Auckland in 1997. Bethell herself described the relationship as "prevailingly maternal", but there is no way of knowing for sure what the relationship between them was, except that it was a close and loving relationship.

Poet and salonnière

Bethell only began to write poetry at the age of about 50. Most of it was written during her years at Rise Cottage with Pollen. At first she had no design to publish her poems, but wrote them as messages to send in letters to her friends. She was deeply affected by Pollen's death in 1934, writing to a friend that the event was "a complete shattering of my life.... [for] from her I have had love, tenderness, and understanding... and close and happy companionship". She wrote little more afterwards, so that most of her output dates from the one decade of 1924 to 1934. Vincent O'Sullivan said, "She was surprised that people admired her 'garden' poems, often written as casual messages to friends.... By the late 1920s, she was also writing the more deliberate and intellectually adventurous poems which took their place in her later two books." After Pollen's death, she sold Rise Cottage and moved into a room in a house she had gifted to the Anglican church.

Her first collection, From a Garden in the Antipodies (1929), is her best-known work; its poems have often been anthologised. It expresses an awareness of her separation from "loved and lost London", and themes of religious thought and nature that marked all her work. Her later collections include poems for which there had been no place in the first collection, and memorial poems to Pollen. Her poetry is ascribed by the Oxford Companion to Twentieth-Century Literature in English "a plainness and spareness (as well as freshness of image) which distinguishes it from the more ornamented verse the country had previously produced."

The New Zealand writer Charles Brasch, visiting Bethell in the late 1930s, found her at "the centre of an astonishingly diverse circle of interesting people, many of the younger of whom were so close to her that she almost directed their lives." Among them were the crime writer Ngaio Marsh, the essayist M. H. Holcroft, the artists R. H. Field and Evelyn Margaret Page, the poets Blanche Edith Baughan and J. H. E. Schroder, and the musician Frederick Joseph Page. She acted as a mentor to younger local poets, notably Allen Curnow and Denis Glover.

All Bethell's work appeared anonymously, as she felt that publicity in "provincial New Zealand" would be a "painful affair". She said her pseudonym, Evelyn Hayes, came from a great-great-grandfather, Sir Henry Hayes of Cork, who was "deported for life to Botany Bay for attempted abduction of a Quaker heiress." In later life, she became less keen to be anonymous, and before her death asked that her collected poems be published under her own name.

Death and legacy
Bethell died in Christchurch on 15 January 1945. A volume of her Collected Poems appeared posthumously in 1950 and was reprinted in 1985 with an introduction by O'Sullivan. In 1948, after her death, several New Zealand authors contributed personal reflections to Landfall. The educator and writer Crawford Somerset opined, "New Zealand has produced no other poetry so clearly original and so delicately sensitive as Ursula Bethell's." The poet and journalist D'Arcy Cresswell said that in literature "New Zealand wasn't truly discovered, in fact, until Ursula Bethell, 'very earnestly digging', raised her head to look at the mountains. Almost everyone had been blind before."

She featured prominently in both of Curnow's notable anthologies, A Book of New Zealand Verse 1923–1945 (1945) (in which 19 of her poems were printed, more than any other poet) and The Penguin Book of New Zealand Verse (1960), and later in The Penguin Book of New Zealand Verse (1985) edited by Ian Wedde and Harvey McQueen.

In 1979, the University of Canterbury founded the Ursula Bethell Residency in Creative Writing to support and encourage New Zealand writing. It goes to writers of "proven merit". Notable recipients have included Margaret Mahy, Keri Hulme and Eleanor Catton.

Published works
(As Evelyn Hayes) From a Garden in the Antipodes (London: Sidgwick and Jackson, 1929)
(As "The Author of Poems From a Garden in the Antipodes") Time and Place (Christchurch: Caxton, 1936)
(As "The Author of Time and Place") Day and Night: Poems 1924–1934, (Christchurch: Caxton, 1939)
Collected Poems, ed. Helen Simpson, (Christchurch: Caxton Press, 1950), (Kindle edition 2016, ASIN: B016QNELZ4) 
Collected Poems, ed. Vincent O’Sullivan, (Wellington: Victoria University Press, 1985 [1950])
Vibrant with Words: The Letters of Ursula Bethell, ed. Peter Whiteford (Wellington: Victoria University Press, 2005).

References

External links
Ursula Bethell, author page at the New Zealand Electronic Poetry Centre
Bethell, (Mary) Ursula, profile at Read NZ Te Pou Muramura

1874 births
1945 deaths
New Zealand social workers
English emigrants to New Zealand
New Zealand poets
New Zealand women poets
New Zealand Anglo-Catholics
20th-century New Zealand poets
People educated at Christchurch Girls' High School
People educated at Oxford High School, England
People from Christchurch
Pseudonymous women writers
20th-century pseudonymous writers
20th-century New Zealand women writers